Thomas J. Furst is the senior vice president and chief financial officer of SRI International, a position he has held since 1996. He was the director of the Sarnoff Corporation until its absorption into SRI.

Early life and education
Furst earned bachelor of science in economics from Villanova University and a Master of Business Administration from the College of William & Mary.

Career
Furst held management positions in finance with HRB-Singer and RCA. He was then vice president of financial operations at PRC.

In 1991, Furst served as the chief financial executive of Booz Allen Hamilton's Worldwide Technology Business. In 1996, he became SRI International's chief financial officer.

References

Living people
College of William & Mary alumni
Villanova University alumni
Place of birth missing (living people)
Year of birth missing (living people)
SRI International people
American chief financial officers